Phryganodes lanialis is a moth in the family Crambidae. It was described by George Hampson in 1899. It is found in Papua New Guinea, where it has been recorded from the D'Entrecasteaux Islands (Fergusson Island).

References

Spilomelinae
Moths described in 1899